Parmena pubescens is a species of beetle in the family Cerambycidae. It was described by Dalman in 1817, originally under the genus Lamia. It has a wide distribution between Europe and Africa. It feeds on Ficus carica and Nerium oleander.

Subspecies
 Parmena pubescens pilosa (Brullé, 1833)
 Parmena pubescens pubescens (Dalman, 1817)

References

Parmenini
Beetles described in 1817